Mathieu Baudet-Lafarge (1765–1837) was a French politician. He served as a member of the Council of Five Hundred from 1898 to 1899, and as a member of the Chamber of Deputies from 1830 to 1833, representing Puy-de-Dôme.

References

1765 births
1837 deaths
People from Puy-de-Dôme
Politicians from Auvergne-Rhône-Alpes
Members of the Council of Five Hundred
Members of the 1st Chamber of Deputies of the July Monarchy
Members of the 2nd Chamber of Deputies of the July Monarchy